Clyde E. Stone (March 23, 1876 – January 14, 1948) was an American jurist.

Biography
Born near Mason City, Illinois, Stone graduated from Mason City High School and received his bachelor's degree from University of Illinois. He taught school for six years and then started practicing law in Peoria, Illinois in 1903 after being admitted to the Illinois bar. Stone was an assistant state's attorney. Stone served as county judge and then circuit court judge. He was a Republican. In 1918, Stone was elected to the Illinois Supreme Court and served until his death in 1948. Stone was chief justice of the court. Stone died of a stroke in Tucson, Arizona while on vacation.

References

1876 births
1948 deaths
People from Mason City, Illinois
People from Peoria, Illinois
University of Illinois Urbana-Champaign alumni
Illinois lawyers
Illinois Republicans
Illinois state court judges
Chief Justices of the Illinois Supreme Court
Justices of the Illinois Supreme Court